Guillermo Durán and Máximo González were the defending champions but only González chose to defend his title, partnering Sergio Galdós. González lost in the final to Julio Peralta and Horacio Zeballos.

Peralta and Zeballos won the title after defeating Galdós and González 6–3, 6–4 in the final.

Seeds

Draw

References
 Main Draw

Santiago Challenger - Doubles